The Tor Line was a freight shipping company.  Together with its subsidiaries, the Tor Line operated a fleet of approximately 65 ro-ro, ro-pax and lo-lo ships, primarily on the North and Baltic Seas. It was ultimately purchased by Denmark-based DFDS, which renamed it DFDS Tor Line, and it operated as a freight-carrying division of DFDS along with DFDS Lisco, DFDS Lys Line and DFDS Container Line before retiring the brand.

Tor Line was founded as a joint venture between the Swedish Trans Oil Shipping and Rex Shipping to operate car-passenger ferries between Sweden, England and the Netherlands. The company name was an abbreviation of the founding companies' names, Trains Oil and Rex Line. Tor Line begun passenger operations in 1966 and freight operations in 1969. In 1980 Tor Line formed a brief joint venture for passenger services, Sessan Tor Line, with Sessan Line. A similar joint venture was formed for freight services with Swedish Lloyd. Both proved short-lived: Stena Line acquired Sessan Line in 1981, and during the same year Tor Line passenger services were sold to DFDS. A year later DFDS also acquired Tor Line's freight services. Initially both divisions were marketed as DFDS Tor Line, but the passenger ferries were later moved under the DFDS brand.

History

Passenger operations 1966–1981
Two Swedish shipping companies, Trans Oil Shipping and Rex Shipping, decided to form a new company for providing car/passenger ferry services between Sweden, England and the Netherlands. The new Tor Line (an abbreviation of Trans Oil and Rex) ordered the construction of two state-of-the-art ferries from Lübecker Flender-Werke in West Germany. Meanwhile, Bratt-Götha and the Dutch KNSM (Koninklijke Nederlandsche Stoomboot-Maatschappij) joined as shareholders (25% each). Tor Line's main rivals on the Sweden—England route were England-Sweden Line (ESL), a joint service operated by Ellerman's Wilson Line, Swedish Lloyd and Rederi AB Svea. The ESL partner companies had also brought new ships on the route in 1966, but these were slower than the Tor ships, had less modern furnishings and lacked full-height cardecks.

With the delivery of the new ships the Tor Anglia and Tor Hollandia were sold. Also in 1976 the English terminal of Tor Line's services was moved to Felixstowe. The new ships were arguably the finest ferries of the time, and served as the final blow to the ESL service. Ellerman's Wilson Line and Rederi AB Svea had already dropped out of the joint service previously, and in 1977 Swedish Lloyd also ceased their passenger operations. Despite their dominant position in the Sweden-England service Tor Line's financial position was precarious. There was not enough passenger demand for two large ships on the service during the winter months; due to this the Tor Scandinavia was chartered out as an expedition ship during the winter seasons from 1979 onwards.

To improve their financial position Tor line sought out partnerships with other shipping companies. In 1979  (the former Tor Anglia) was chartered for a planned joint Gothenburg—Kristiansand—Newcastle with Fred. Olsen, but Fred. Olsen pulled out before the service could commence. Instead the Espresso Olbia was laid up in Gothenburg. In early 1980 a more successful joint service was formed with Sessan Line, when Sessan Tor Line was established. Logos of the new joint service were painted on Tor Line's ships. Sessan Tor Line proved short-lived as Sessan's main competitors Stena Line purchased Sessan in early 1981. Subsequently, Tor Line entered negotiations to sell either the Tor Britannia or Tor Scandinavia to DFDS. Instead of buying just one ship DFDS purchased the entire Tor Line passenger division in late 1981. Initially the Tor ships were marketed as DFDS Tor Line, but were subsequently absorbed into DFDS' passenger division DFDS Seaways. Despite this they kept their original Tor-prefixed names until 1990–1991.

Freight operations 1969 onwards
In 1980, around the same time as the establishment of joint passenger services with Sessan Line, Tor Line established a joint freight service with their former competitors Swedish Lloyd, marketed as Tor Lloyd. During the Falklands War at least one of the Tor Lloyd ships, was chartered to the United Kingdom Ministry of Defence for service as a supply vessel.

Like the joint Sessan Tor service, the joint Tor Lloyd service proved short-lived, and in 1982 DFDS acquired Tor Line's freight operations. Following the acquisition the former Tor Line ships were rebranded DFDS Tor Line, and subsequently the Tor division developed into DFDS' main freight-carrying subsidiary.

Organisation changes 2010 onwards
In 2010 DFDS acquired Norfolkline from Maersk. Following restructuring, the operations of DFDS Tor Line, DFDS Lisco and Norfolkline were integrated into DFDS Seaways. The merger led to changes and additions to freight destinations and an expansion in freight volumes. It is at this point that the historic Tor Line ceased to exist as a brand and entity, though its contributions to the legacy of North Sea and Baltic Sea maritime shipping remains.

Fleet

Former ships

Passenger ferries

Freighters

References

External links
 DFDS Tor Line official website

Shipping companies of Denmark
Shipping companies based in Copenhagen
Ferry companies of Sweden
Danish companies established in 1966
DFDS